The Namhae Expressway (Korean: 남해고속도로, Namhae Gosok Doro) is a freeway in South Korea, connecting Yeongam to Suncheon, Gwangyang, Jinju, Changwon and Busan.

It was opened in 1973 with Honam Expressway's Jeonju - Suncheon section, through W.Suncheon IC is connected to the Honam Expressway.

At the time this was an opening round two-lane road. However, through the expansion progressed from 1977 to 1996 was expanded to four lanes round the entire section.

It was expanded to 8 lanes 2001 Naengjeong JCT ~ Changwon JCT section, with 8 lanes 2011 Sanin JCT ~ Jinju section, Sacheon ~ Jinju section has been expanded to 6 lanes, December 2014 Naengjeong JCT ~ Daejeo JCT section is extended to 6-8 lanes some section have been expanded such that at least 6 lanes.

Yeongam - Suncheon section's construction period by 2002 was inaugurated April 27, 2012. Mokpo and Busan opening section, but this is easily linked to the, not directly in some sections it has the disadvantage of an indirect linkage to the national highway.

History 
 10 November 1972 - Busan-Suncheon construction sector.
 14 November 1973 - Busan-Suncheon opening section.
 22 May 1978 - Highway Namhae 2nd Branch construction sector. 
 4 September 1981 - Naengjeong-Sasang of highway Namhae 2nd Branch and 4-lane round-trip of W.Masan - Naejeong opening.
 7 September 1989 - 4-lane round-trip of Jinju - W.Masan opening.
 9 November 1991 - Highway Namhae 3rd Branch construction sector.
 27 December 1995 - Highway Namhae 3rd Branch opens to traffic.
 1 July 1996 - Highway Namhae 3rd Branch lowered to National Highway(National Route 59)
 27 April 2012 - Jungnim~Suncheonman opening section. (indirect Connected with Suncheon-Busan)

Constructions

Lanes 
 Jungnim JC~Sacheon IC, Sanin JC~Changwon JC: 4
 Sacheon IC~Jinju JC: 6
 Jinju JC~Sanin JC, Changwon JC~Deokcheon JC: 8

Length 
 Yeongam~Suncheon: 106.84 km
 Suncheon~Busan: 166.33 km

Limited Speed 
 100 km/h

List of facilities 

 IC: Interchange, JC: Junction, SA: Service Area, TG:Tollgate

Yeongam~Suncheon(Mokpo~Gwangyang) 106.84km

West Suncheon~Busan 166.33km

Namhae 1st Branch Expressway 

The Namhae 1st Branch Expressway(Korean:남해고속도로 제1지선, Namhae Gosok Doro Je-il(1) Jiseon) is a freeway in South Korea, connecting Haman to Changwon. It is Branch Line of Namhae Expressway.

History 
 14 November 1973: Open to Traffic.(This segment is one of the Namhae Expressway)
 25 August 2001: Masan North Sunhwan Expressway(마산외각고속도로) opens to traffic.(Sanin~Changwon)
 17 November 2008: This segment is endowed name with Namhae 1st Branch Expressway, And Masan North Sunhwan Expressway is changed name with Namhae Expressway.

Constructions

Lanes 
 4 lanes

Length 
 17.88 km

Limited Speed 
 100 km/h

= List of facilities 
=
 IC: Interchange, JC: Junction, SA: Service Area, TG:Tollgate

Namhae 2nd Branch Expressway 

The Namhae 2nd Branch Expressway(Korean:남해고속도로 제2지선, Namhae Gosok Doro Je-i(2) Jiseon) is a freeway in South Korea, connecting Gimhae to Busan. It is Branch Line of Namhae Expressway. Former name is Buma Expressway(부마고속도로).

History 
 22 May 1978: Construction Begin
 4 September 1981: Opens to traffic.(Name: Buma Expressway)
 29 April 1992: Name is changed to Namhae 2nd Branch Expressway

Constructions

Lanes 
 4 lanes

Length 
 20.6 km

Limited Speed 
 90 km/h

= List of facilities 
=
 IC: Interchange, JC: Junction, SA: Service Area, TG:Tollgate

See also
Roads and expressways in South Korea
Transportation in South Korea

External links
 MOLIT South Korean Government Transport Department

 
Expressways in South Korea
Roads in South Jeolla
Roads in South Gyeongsang
Roads in Busan